Autogeddon is the eleventh solo album by Julian Cope, released in 1994 on The Echo Label. According to the album's sleeve notes, written by Cope, it was "inspired by Heathcote Williams' epic poem of the same name and a little incident concerning my pregnant wife (and myself) and £375,000 of yellow Ferrari in St. Martin's Lane, London, England".

The album is largely a diatribe against car culture. Heathcote Williams' poem characterises the motor car's global death toll as "A humdrum holocaust, the third world war nobody bothered to declare". Cope's railing against car culture was symptomatic of his rejection of numerous aspects of Western consumerism.

AllMusic's album review reads in part: "Concluding the trilogy started by Peggy Suicide and Jehovahkill, Autogeddon, as the title gives away, targets cars, specifically as a metaphor for environmental destruction. Combined with the continuing focus on heathen religious practices and ancient monuments (the first part of 'Paranormal in the West Country' was, in fact, recorded in the West Kennet Longbarrow in Wiltshire), the album is almost a summation of Cope's current interests as well as standing on its own."

The photograph on the front cover is of a now-defunct garage in the hamlet of Druid, near Corwen in Denbighshire.

Track listing 
All songs written by Julian Cope.

"Autogeddon Blues" – 5:14
"Madmax" – 3:39
"Don't Call Me Mark Chapman" – 5:21
"I Gotta Walk" – 2:28
"Ain't No Gettin' Round Gettin' Round" – 5:01
 "Paranormal in the West Country (Medley: Paranormal Pt.1; Archdrude's Roadtrip; Kar-ma-kanik)" – 8:29
"Ain't But the One Way" – 4:30
"s•t•a•r•c•a•r" – 11:29

Personnel 
Musicians
 Julian Cope 
 Michael "Moon-Eye" Watts 
 Donald Ross Skinner 
 Thighpaulsandra 
 Mark "Rooster" Cosby 
 Dorian Cope (credited as "Mavis Grind")
 Jill Frost (aka Jill Bryson of Strawberry Switchblade)
 Richard Frost (credited as "K-R Frost")

Production
 Julian Cope – producer, photography
 Thighpaulsandra – mix, photography
 Shaun Harvey – recording, mix on "Madmax", additional recording on "s•t•a•r•c•a•r"
 Rob Carter – sleeve
 Sebastian Shelton – executive producer

Chart positions

References 

1994 albums
Julian Cope albums